Tor Isedal (20 July 1924 – 18 February 1990) was a Swedish actor on stage, screen and television. He appeared in more than 70 films between 1952 and 1990. One of his sons is Swedish actor Ola Isedal.

Partial filmography
 She Came Like the Wind (1952)
 The Road to Klockrike (1953)
 The Magnificent Lie (1955)
 Rabies (1958)
 The Virgin Spring (1960)
 Rififi in Stockholm (1961)
 Siska (1962)
 The Lady in White (1962)
 Hide and Seek (1963)
 Swedish Wedding Night (1964)
 Morianna (1965)
 Ormen (1966)
 Roseanna (1967)
 Pippi in the South Seas (1970)
 The Lustful Vicar (1970)
 Exponerad (1971)
 The Day the Clown Cried (1972) (unreleased)

External links

1924 births
1990 deaths
People from Norrköping
Swedish male film actors
20th-century Swedish male actors